The Château du Vert-Bois is a historic château in Bondues, Nord, France. It was completed in 1777. It has been listed as an official historical monument since 1962.

References

Châteaux in Nord (French department)
Monuments historiques of Nord (French department)